Sebastian Ofner was the defending champion but chose not to defend his title.

Daniel Altmaier won the title after defeating Alejandro Tabilo 6–3, 3–6, 6–3 in the final.

Seeds

Draw

Finals

Top half

Bottom half

References

External links
Main draw
Qualifying draw

Puerto Vallarta Open - 1